Mary Schneider is an American politician who, as of 2017, sits in the North Dakota House of Representatives.

Schneider has served in the North Dakota House of Representatives since 2015 and, for a brief period, sat in the chamber at the same time as her son, Mac Schneider, until he lost his reelection bid.

References

Year of birth missing (living people)
Living people
Women state legislators in North Dakota
21st-century American politicians
21st-century American women politicians
Democratic Party members of the North Dakota House of Representatives